Heinz Günter Mebusch (1952–2001) was a German photographer and experimental artist born in Düsseldorf.

Biography 
Mebusch studied photography and visual communication with Otto Steinert and Erich vom Endt. He lived and worked in about forty countries in Europe, Africa and America. Mebusch spoke fluent English, Spanish, French and was familiar with Greek and Arabic.  He was also a lecturer at the Folkwang-School in Essen and organized and curated art and photo-projects, including the Beuys Festival in 1991 in Düsseldorf.

His works 
Mebusch's estate maintains archives of his film negatives, published vintage prints and manuscripts on photography, art and philosophy. His estate is administrated by the charitable European  Artforum Culture Foundation (ACF).

Exhibitions
Mebusch exhibited in Costa Rica, Luxembourg, Austria, Germany and USA and represented Germany at the Venice Biennale in 1999.

Artist portraits 

His ongoing project of over two decades was Face to Face, portraits of modern and contemporary artists. More than  200 artists-portraits were realized from 1979-2000. A few working and vintage prints were made still before his early death. In a few cases these photo-prints have additional signatures and over-paintings by the respective artist. A portfolio of all his portraits was prepared by Mebusch and a limited number of these portraits were prepared by as large-format prints. The final edition, based on Mebusch's specifications, will be realized under the title Face to Face – Planet of the Artists, by ArtForum Editions, through the Artforum Culture Foundation.

Black and white portraits and colour prints were made of Joseph Beuys, James Lee Byars, Ford Beckmann, Fernando Botero, Herman de Vries, Felix Droese, Erró, Keith Haring, Dennis Hopper, Jörg Immendorff, Martin Kippenberger, Meret Oppenheim, A.R. Penck, Gerhard Richter, Richard Serra, Yannis Tsarouchis and Wolf Vostell. This project is in context with the projects of the same title by Vera Isler-Leiner, who had met Mebusch in Kassel in 1996.

External links 
 Artforum Culture Foundation Website
 Menschen im Bild - Heinz Günter Mebusch
 Heinz Günter Mebusch photo-portraits-Collection Tom Aaron Hawk
 Documenta Archiv
 Kurzbiografie
 Obituary I memento
 Winter Stiftung

References 

 Heinz Günter Mebusch, vu au passage, 1979
 Heinz Günter Mebusch, Reise zum Planeten Ars, Wien 1985
 Heinz Günter Mebusch, Was ist Kunst?, Wien 1985
 Mebusch/Jansen/Beuys, in: Joseph Beuys: Denken! Denken an Joseph Beuys, Meerbusch-Ilverich 1986
 Mebusch, Beiträge in: Refigured Painting. The German image 1960 - 1988, Katalog S. Guggenheim Museum, New York 1988, 1989
 Heinz Günter Mebusch, Face to Face, Basel 1994
 Isler, Vera I Mebusch, Heinz-Günter I Moore, John CB,  Modern Photo Portraits, ed. O.Y. Safiriou, Thessaloniki I Cologne 1998
 Was war los am Beuys Geburtstag 1991? 70 Stunden Dauerfeuer! JB s GB. Düsseldorfer Beuys-Festspiele. ( Joseph Beuys zum 70. Geburtstag). Hg. Heinz-Günter Mebusch und Tom A. Hawk, Düsseldorf 2001
 Meret Oppenheim, Katalog, Berlin, Wien 2014. Zusätzlich Cover der Werbekampagne Wien und Berlin.
 FAMOUS, Reflections on the work of the conceptual artist and photographer, Peter Merten und K.J. Safiriou (Hg.) Thessaloniki, Athen 2016
 FAMOUS, Peter Merten und K.J. Safiriou (Hg.) Thessaloniki, Athen 2016
 Geglaubte Wahrheiten. Beitrag zur Philosophie der Fotografie. Betrachtungen zum Werk des Konzeptkünstlers und Fotografen Heinz Günter Mebusch, 2 Bde., bearbeitet und neu hrsg. 2020, ArtForum Editions.
 Fantastic Woman, catalogue Schirn Kunsthalle Frankfurt I Louisiana Museum of Modern Art, p. 66, reference p. 417
 Heinz-Günter Mebusch, Unveröffentlichte Schriften, The Mebusch Archive I Artforum Culture Foundation

1952 births
2001 deaths
Photographers from North Rhine-Westphalia
Artists from Düsseldorf